State Route 186 (SR 186) is a north–south state highway in the northwestern part of the U.S. state of Ohio. North of State Route 613, State Route 235 carries on as a solo route.

Route description
State Route 186 travels entirely within the northwestern quadrant of Hancock County.  It is not included within the National Highway System.

History
When originally designated in 1924, State Route 186 composed of the entirety of its current route, and the stretch of State Route 235 from the current northern terminus of State Route 186 in McComb to Hoytville.  In 1937, State Route 186 was extended north along the current alignment of State Route 235 from Hoytville to that highway's current northern terminus at State Route 65 along the Maumee River northeast of Grand Rapids.  Two years later, however, State Route 186 was shortened to the routing that it has today when the former State Route 69 (now State Route 235) was extended north from McComb over what was the segment of State Route 186 from there to State Route 65.

Major intersections

References

186
Transportation in Hancock County, Ohio